The Olsen Gang in Deep Trouble is a 2013 Danish 3D computer-animated comedy film directed by Jørgen Lerdam from a screenplay by Tine Krull Petersen. Released on 10 October 2013, it is a sequel to Olsen Gang Gets Polished and is the second animated film in the Olsen Gang franchise. Produced by A. Film Production and Nordisk Film, it was released on 10 October 2013.

Voice cast 
 as Egon Olsen
Nicolaj Kopernikus as Benny Frandsen
 as Kjeld Jensen
Annette Heick as Yvonne Jensen
Lars Ranthe as Dynamite Harry
Søren Sætter-Lassen as Bang Johansen
 as Bang Bang Johnson
 as Ilza
 as Jensen's criminal assistant
Jonas Schmidt as Holm

See also 
Olsenbanden Jr.

References

External links 

2013 films
2013 animated films
2010s children's animated films
Danish animated films
Danish comedy films
Danish children's films